Adriaan van der Woude (3 June 1930, Westerbroek – 20 August 2017) was a Dutch nuclear physicist, known as a leading expert on giant resonances.

Education and career
He matriculated in 1948 at the University of Groningen, where he graduated in 1954 with s M.Sc. equivalent and in 1960 with a Ph.D. His doctoral dissertation Construction and operation of betatron and cloud chamber was supervised by Hendrik "Henk" Brinkmann (1909–1994). Van der Woude worked from 1960 to 1963 in Brinkmann's group at the University of Groningen's Physics Laboratory. From 1963 to 1965 he was on a leave of absence from the University of Groningen and did research at Oak Ridge National Laboratory on nuclear and atomic physics. The AGOR cyclotron facility is useful for "radio-biology research and radiation hardness testing of electronics and materials."

Van der Woude became a member of the Nuclear Physics European Collaboration Committee (NuPECC). In 1990 he became the chair of the editorial board of NuPECC's Nuclear Physics News and the chair of the Groningen Royal Physical Society.

In 1979 he was elected a Fellow of the American Physical Society. Later he was appointed an Officer of the Order of Orange-Nassau.

On the occasion of his retirement in 1995 the international “Giant Resonances” Conference was held in Groningen in his honor.

Selected publications

References

1930 births
2017 deaths
20th-century Dutch physicists
21st-century Dutch physicists
Dutch nuclear physicists
University of Groningen alumni
Academic staff of the University of Groningen
Oak Ridge National Laboratory people
Fellows of the American Physical Society
Officers of the Order of Orange-Nassau